Graham Williams may refer to:

Sportspeople
Graham Williams (Australian cricketer) (1911–1978), Australian cricketer and prisoner of war
Graham Williams (footballer, born 1936) (1936–2018), Welsh international footballer who played for nine teams in England and Wales
Graham Williams (footballer, born 1938), Welsh international footballer who played for West Bromwich Albion and managed Weymouth and Cardiff City
Graham Williams (rugby league) (1944–1994), English rugby league footballer who played in the 1960s and 1970s, and coached in the 1980s
Graham Williams (rugby union) (1945–2018), New Zealand rugby union footballer
Graham Williams (English cricketer) (born 1985), English cricketer

Others
Graham Williams (television producer) (1945–1990), British television producer and script editor
Graham Williams (promoter) (born 1978), concert promoter based in Austin, Texas, USA
Graham Headley Williams, guitarist with Welsh band Racing Cars